The Royal Mint of Belgium (French: La Monnaie Royale de Belgique; Dutch: De Koninklijke Munt van België) was responsible for minting all official coins of Kingdom of Belgium from 1832 to 2017. As of 2018 the official legal tender of Belgium are the euro and euro cent coins. It is under the control of the Belgian Administration of the Treasury. As of 2018, the mint still exists but no longer strikes coins and is instead responsible for ordering them from the Netherlands. The coins minted are distributed by the National Bank of Belgium.

References

External links

Mints (currency)
Economy of Belgium
Organisations based in Belgium with royal patronage